Mark Jacobs is an American game designer, programmer, author and businessman, and the former GM/VP/CEO of Mythic Entertainment, Inc and after Mythic Entertainment was sold to Electronic Arts in 2006 he served as its GM/VP/CEO at EA. Best known as a lead designer of Dark Age of Camelot (2001) and Camelot Unchained (2019), he also created two early MUDs, Aradath and Dragon's Gate, serving as both the designer and programmer in addition to his duties as President/CEO. He founded A.U.S.I. (Adventures Unlimited Software Inc.) in 1983 and worked on a number of computer games for systems such as the Apple II.  He is also a screenwriter, having penned a number of screenplays including one based on the game Imperator Online.

He is known for his strong position against "real money transfer", a.k.a. "gold selling". Jacobs left EA in June 2009 after the company decided to merge BioWare with Mythic Entertainment.

Biography 

Jacobs attended Syracuse University and graduated, magna cum laude with a Bachelor of Arts degree.  He then attended Georgetown University Law Center and graduated with a Juris Doctor.  While at GULC, he started his first computer game company, Adventures Unlimited Software Inc. in 1983.  In the 1980s and until 1995, he created online games for both local networks and nationwide networks such as GEnie, AOL and Kesmai's Gamestorm network.

In 1995, he was the co-founder (along with Rob Denton), President and CEO of Mythic Entertainment, Inc.  He was involved in all Mythic Entertainment games since 1995, including their most successful product, the MMORPG Dark Age Of Camelot.

In March 2011, he was the co-founder of City State Entertainment, along with Andrew Meggs, President of City State Entertainment.

Games 

 Attack of the Killer Bees (designer, programmer, A.U.S.I., 1983)
 Aradath (Lead designer, programmer, CEO A.U.S.I., 1984)
 Galaxy (Lead designer, programmer, CEO A.U.S.I., 1989)
 Dragon's Gate (Lead designer, programmer, CEO, A.U.S.I., 1990)
 Splatterball (Lead designer, CEO Mythic Entertainment, 1996)
 Magestorm (Lead designer, CEO Mythic Entertainment, 1996)
 Castles II – Online (Lead designer, CEO Mythic Entertainment, 1996)
 Aliens Online (designer, CEO Mythic Entertainment, 1997)
 Rolemaster: Bladelands (Lead designer, CEO Mythic Entertainment, 1997)
 Darkness Falls (Lead designer, CEO Mythic Entertainment, 1997)
 Starship Troopers: Battlespace (Lead designer, CEO Mythic Entertainment, 1998)
 Godzilla Online (Lead designer, CEO Mythic Entertainment, 1998)
 Splatterball Plus (Lead designer, CEO Mythic Entertainment, 1999)
 Darkness Falls: The Crusade (Lead designer, head acrobat, CEO Mythic Entertainment, 1999)
 Silent Death Online (Lead designer, CEO Mythic Entertainment, 1999)
 Spellbinder II – The Nexus Conflict (designer, CEO Mythic Entertainment, 1999)
 Darkstorm: Well of Souls (Lead designer, CEO Mythic Entertainment, 1999 – never completed)
 Independence Day Online (Lead designer, CEO Mythic Entertainment, 2000)
 Imperator Online (Lead designer, CEO Mythic Entertainment, 2001)
 Dark Age of Camelot (Lead designer, CEO Mythic Entertainment, 2001)
 Dark Age of Camelot: Shrouded Isles (Lead designer, CEO Mythic Entertainment, 2002)
 Dark Age of Camelot: Trials of Atlantis (Lead designer, CEO Mythic Entertainment, 2003)
 Dark Age of Camelot: Foundations (Lead designer, CEO Mythic Entertainment, 2003)
 Dark Age of Camelot: 'New Frontiers' (Lead designer, CEO Mythic Entertainment, 2004)
 Dark Age of Camelot: Catacombs (Lead designer, CEO Mythic Entertainment, 2005)
 Dark Age of Camelot: Darkness Rising (Lead designer, EA Mythic, 2006)
 Dark Age of Camelot: Labyrinth of the Minotaur (EA Mythic, 2007)
 Warhammer Online: Age of Reckoning (Lead designer, CEO Mythic Entertainment, 2008)
 Camelot Unchained'' (Lead designer, CEO City State Entertainment, TBD)

References 

American video game designers
MUD developers
Living people
Syracuse University alumni
Georgetown University alumni
Place of birth missing (living people)
Year of birth missing (living people)